"Where Do the Children Play?" is a song by British folk rock musician Cat Stevens, released as the opening track on his November 1970 album Tea for the Tillerman.

In 2017, Garbage recorded a cover of the song for United Nations charity album, Music To Inspire: Artists UNited Against Human Trafficking.

References

Cat Stevens songs
Songs written by Cat Stevens
Songs about children
Environmental songs
Dolly Parton songs
Song recordings produced by Paul Samwell-Smith
1970 songs